The following is a partial list of British recipients of the Victoria Cross.

** Holders of VC and bar (twice awarded the VC).

See also

England
Victoria Cross, English
 
 Victoria Cross recipients